Central Colo is a locality of Sydney, in the state of New South Wales, Australia. It is located in the City of Hawkesbury west of Colo and to the south of the Colo River near its confluence with the Hawkesbury River.

References

Sydney localities
City of Hawkesbury
Hawkesbury River